Serrana Andrea Fernández la Banca (born November 13, 1973) is an Olympic backstroke swimmer from Uruguay. She competed at the 2000 and 2004 Olympics, where she was flagbearer for Uruguay in the Opening Ceremony. 

Since 2007 she lives in Spain (Alicante).

She swam at the 1991 and 2003 Pan American Games.

As of July 2009, she still holds the Uruguay Records in all 3 long-course backstroke events at:
50 back: 29.81
100 back: 1:04.99
200 back: 2:24.41.

References

 Terra

1973 births
Living people
Olympic swimmers of Uruguay
Female backstroke swimmers
Swimmers at the 1991 Pan American Games
Swimmers at the 2000 Summer Olympics
Swimmers at the 2003 Pan American Games
Swimmers at the 2004 Summer Olympics
Pan American Games competitors for Uruguay
Uruguayan female swimmers